Denis Iguma is a Ugandan professional footballer who currently  plays as a defender for KCCA FC and the Uganda national football team.

International career
He made his debut for Uganda national football team on 29 March 2012 against Egypt national football team.
In January 2014, coach Milutin Sedrojevic, invited him to be a part of the Uganda national football team for the 2014 African Nations Championship. The team placed third in the group stage of the competition after beating Burkina Faso, drawing with Zimbabwe and losing to Morocco. In 2017, he was included in the 23 man squad at the 2017 Africa Cup of Nations.

International goals
Scores and results list Uganda's goal tally first.

References

External links
 
 
 

Living people
1994 births
Association football defenders
Uganda A' international footballers
2014 African Nations Championship players
2017 Africa Cup of Nations players
Ugandan footballers
Al Ahed FC players
SC Victoria University players
Uganda international footballers
People from Kalangala District
Ugandan expatriate sportspeople in Lebanon
Expatriate footballers in Lebanon
Ugandan expatriate footballers
Bekaa SC players
Lebanese Premier League players
2020 African Nations Championship players